María Gracia Figueroa is a Peruvian model and a pageant titleholder who represented her country in the Miss International 2013 which was held in Tokyo, Japan on December 17, 2013. She also won Miss Earth Peru 2011 and Miss Teen Peru Universe 2009.

Miss International Peru 2013
Figueroa was designated by the Miss International Peru Organization to represent her country in the Miss International 2013 beauty pageant which took place on December 17 at Shinagawa Prince Hotel Hall in Tokyo, Japan.

Miss Earth Peru 2011

Figueroa competed and won the Miss Earth Peru 2011 title on August 20, 2011 which was held in Pedro de Osma Museum, in Barranco district in the city of Lima.

She represented Peru in the Miss Earth 2011 pageant in Manila, Philippines  (December 3, 2011) and she won two titles: Miss Pagudpud's crown, which is a title given by the people of the city which holds the same name, and Miss Swimsuit.

Miss Teen Peru Universe 2009
Figueroa, who represented Tumbes, competed and won in the Miss Teen Peru Universe 2009 pageant. She was crowned and received the scepter from Lorerei Cornejo, Miss Teen Universe 2008. The event was held at the Odria Fundo de Surco and participated by 23 candidates. She was 18-year-old at the time of the pageant.

References

Living people
Peruvian beauty pageant winners
People from Lima
Miss Earth 2011 contestants
Year of birth missing (living people)
Miss International 2013 delegates